Chukku is a 1973 Indian Malayalam film, directed by K. S. Sethumadhavan and produced by M. O. Joseph. The film stars Madhu, Sheela, Adoor Bhasi and Muthukulam Raghavan Pillai in the lead roles. The film had musical score by G. Devarajan.

Cast

Madhu as Chackochan
Sheela as Molly
Adoor Bhasi as Mathayichan
Muthukulam Raghavan Pillai as Paulochan
Sankaradi as Kammath
Bahadoor as Anthony
Kuttyedathi Vilasini as Mary
Master Raghu
Reena
Sujatha as Clara
Vanchiyoor Radha as Chackochan's Mother

Soundtrack
The music was composed by G. Devarajan and the lyrics were written by Vayalar Ramavarma.

References

External links
 

1973 films
1970s Malayalam-language films
Films directed by K. S. Sethumadhavan